De Terp is a subway station on Line C of the Rotterdam Metro and is situated in the town of Capelle aan den IJssel, in the Oostgaarde area, just east of Rotterdam. It is the northern terminus of the line.

The station was opened on 26 May 1994 as part of the extension of the East-West Line or Caland Line from Capelsebrug station. The station consists of an island platform between two tracks. Near the Subway station is Shopping Mall De Terp. Also RET Bus 31 to Rotterdam Alexander stops once in a half-our near the station.

Rotterdam Metro stations
Capelle aan den IJssel
Railway stations opened in 1994
1994 establishments in the Netherlands
Railway stations in the Netherlands opened in the 20th century